The Barber may refer to:
 The Barber (1916 film), a short comedy film
 The Barber (2014 film), a 2014 thriller film
 "The Barber" (short story), a short story by Flannery O'Connor
 "The Barber" (Seinfeld), an episode of Seinfeld
 Ralph Daniello or the Barber (1886–1925), New York mobster, murderer and informant
 Sal Maglie or the Barber (1917–1992), Major League Baseball pitcher
 Brutus Beefcake or the Barber, American professional wrestler
 The Barber, a 1915 short comedy film starring Ben Turpin

See also 
 The Barber of Bagdad
 The Barber of Birmingham
 The Barber of Seville
 The Barber of Siberia
 John Factor or Jake the Barber (1882–1984), gangster and con artist
 Barber (disambiguation)